Ralph Dupas (October 14, 1935 – January 25, 2008) was an American boxer from New Orleans who won the world light middleweight championship.

Early boxing career
Dupas was the second of eleven children of a New Orleans fisherman, Peter Dupas. He became a professional boxer in 1950 at the age of 14. Trainer Angelo Dundee saw Dupas fight and took him to Miami to train him.

Dupas became a ranked contender in the lightweight division when he defeated Armand Savoie in 1953. By 1955, after beating a variety of top fighters such as Paddy DeMarco and Kenny Lane, Dupas was the top-ranked lightweight in the world. In May 1957 Dupas challenged Joe Brown for the lightweight title, but lost by an eighth-round knockout. Earlier in 1957, Dupas had filed a lawsuit to establish his race, with Dupas contending that he was white, and therefore permitted to box white opponents in then-segregated Louisiana. Judge Rene Viosca ruled in favor of the claim by Dupas.

Dupas moved up to the welterweight division. He defeated future middleweight champion Joey Giardello in 1961, but lost a 1962 welterweight title shot to Emile Griffith. In 1963, Sugar Ray Robinson beat him by a controversial decision.

Championship
Another championship fight for Dupas materialized in the light middleweight division. Lineal Light Middleweight Champion Denny Moyer came to New Orleans on April 29, 1963, and Dupas won the title with a fifteen-round unanimous decision. He lost the title in September of that year to Italian Sandro Mazzinghi by a thirteen-round knockout. After that match, Emile Griffith once again knocked him out in a non-title bout.

Post-championship career
Dupas briefly retired in 1964 and worked as a card dealer in Las Vegas. He returned to the ring in 1966 and had little success. He retired for good after five fights that year.

After boxing
After he retired, Dupas began to exhibit signs of dementia pugilistica. His brother Tony, also a former fighter, moved Ralph from Las Vegas back to New Orleans and put him in a nursing home.

Professional boxing record

See also
List of world light-middleweight boxing champions

References

External links

 Ralph Dupas - CBZ Profile

 

1935 births
2008 deaths
Boxers from Louisiana
Sportspeople from New Orleans
Sportspeople with chronic traumatic encephalopathy
American male boxers
World Boxing Association champions
World Boxing Council champions
Light-middleweight boxers
World light-middleweight boxing champions